OMC may refer to:

Business
 Oil marketing company

Organizations
 OMC Shipping pte. ltd., a large bulk carrier, container and PCTC shipping company based in Singapore
 Omnicom Group (stock symbol)
 Outboard Marine Corporation
 Olifant Manufacturing Company of South Africa, now known as Land Systems OMC
 Acronym for the World Trade Organization in French, Portuguese and Spanish
 Osaka Medical College
 Oxfordshire Museums Council
 The Oxford Mindfulness Centre (within the Department of Psychiatry, University of Oxford)

Places
 Ormoc Airport in Ormoc City, Leyte, the Philippines

Musical groups
 OMC (band), a New Zealand music group formerly known as Otara Millionaires Club
 Old Man's Child, a Norwegian Black metal band

Technology 
 Operations and Maintenance Centre, a controlling equipment for telecom networks
 Orange Monte Carlo, Android phone

Other
 Octyl methoxycinnamate, the active ingredient in sunscreens
 Open Method of Coordination, a means of governance in the European Union
 Ontario Medal for Good Citizenship
 Order of Cultural Merit
 "Ordinary muon capture"
 Outlaw motorcycle club